Lotus Mark V was a prototype single seater sports car by Colin Chapman that was never built.

Chapman said that he believed a 100-mph road sports car could be developed using an un-supercharged Austin 7 engine. The Lotus Mark V was designed for it.

External links 
 Motorbase Accessed 17 February 2006.

Mark V